The 2000 Volta a la Comunitat Valenciana was the 58th edition of the Volta a la Comunitat Valenciana road cycling stage race, which was held from 22 February to 26 February 2000. The race started in Sagunto and finished in Valencia. The race was won by Abraham Olano of the  team.

General classification

References

Volta a la Comunitat Valenciana
2000 in road cycling
2000 in Spanish sport